Melbourne A. Doig (born in 1912 - died October 25, 1998) was a longtime Communist politician in Ontario, Canada.  He served as leader of the Communist Party of Canada - Ontario in the 1981 provincial election, and was a prominent member of the federal party.

Doig was raised in a working-class community of Montreal, Quebec, and received a Bachelor of Arts degree from the McGill University in 1932.  He also joined the Communist Party of Canada in the 1930s.  Doig campaigned as a candidate of the Labor-Progressive Party in Welland in the 1949 federal election, and subsequently in a 1950 federal by-election in the same riding.  He described himself as an organizer, and finished fourth on both occasions.

Doig served on the Central Committee of the Communist Party of Canada in the early 1980s.  An article in The Globe and Mail lists him as having been 68 years old in 1980.

The same article cites Doig as making the following comments in the 1980 federal election:  "We are struggling to bring about a socialist society based on the interests of the majority of people who fight the exploitation of a minority. While we do see the possibility of achieving this end through the parliamentary process, we do not rule out the possibility of armed struggle if necessary . . . nor are we fighting for a socialist state and government that can be voted out of office through the ballot box."

Doig campaigned in St. Catharines in the 1979 and 1984 federal elections, and in the Toronto riding of St. Paul's for the 1980 federal election.  He described himself as a journalist in 1979 and 1980, and as a secretary in 1984.  Doig never came close to winning election.

During the 1981 provincial campaign, Doig called for a "new majority" of Members of Provincial Parliament who would end the foreign control of provincial industries.  His party's platform called for the nationalization of natural resources, and government takeovers of plants that were in financial jeopardy.  The Communist Party did not run a full slate of candidates, and Doig argued that some members of the New Democratic Party (NDP) could become part of the "new majority" in the legislature.  He received 162 votes in Dovercourt, finishing last against NDP candidate Tony Lupusella.

Electoral record

Notes

  John Fraser, "Commitment to a cause, not votes, prompts these candidates to run", The Globe and Mail, 25 January 1980.
  Stan Oziewicz, "Communists call for 'new majority' to break hold of U.S. companies", The Globe and Mail, 27 February 1981.

1998 deaths
Labor-Progressive Party candidates in the 1949 Canadian federal election
Communist Party of Canada candidates in the 1979 Canadian federal election
Communist Party of Canada candidates in the 1980 Canadian federal election
Communist Party of Canada candidates in the 1984 Canadian federal election
Communist Party of Canada (Ontario) candidates in Ontario provincial elections
Politicians from Montreal
Leaders of the Communist Party of Canada (Ontario)
1912 births